Jane White Cooke (January 10, 1913 – May 8, 2011) was an American portrait painter.

Cooke was born Frances Jane White in Montclair, New Jersey on January 10, 1913.  A war widow, in 1946 she remarried to journalist and broadcaster Alistair Cooke.  She was interested in art from an early age, and as an adult created hundreds of paintings.  Her portraits of Nathan Milstein and Alistair Cooke are in the collection of the National Portrait Gallery in Washington, DC.

References

External links 
 "Jane White" First page of her former gallery/official website, © 2008 by Adam Lindquist Scoville (archived), including thumbnails of 12 of her paintings.

1913 births
2011 deaths
20th-century American painters
21st-century American painters
People from Montclair, New Jersey
American women painters
20th-century American women
21st-century American women